The Nansemond National Wildlife Refuge is a National Wildlife Refuge of the United States located along the Nansemond River in Suffolk, Virginia. It is managed by the United States Fish and Wildlife Service as a satellite of Great Dismal Swamp National Wildlife Refuge. An additional  were transferred in 1999.

The refuge is not open to the public.

External links
US Fish & Wildlife Service: Nansemond National Wildlife Refuge

National Wildlife Refuges in Virginia
Protected areas of Suffolk, Virginia
Protected areas established in 1973
1973 establishments in Virginia
Wetlands of Virginia
Landforms of Suffolk, Virginia